Roter Kamm is a meteorite crater, located in the Sperrgebiet, within the Namibian section of the Namib Desert, approximately  north of Oranjemund and  southwest of Aurus Mountain in the ǁKaras Region. The age is estimated at 4.81 ± 0.5 Ma, placing it in the Pliocene.

Description 
The meteorite hit a layer of Precambrian granitic gneiss that is part of the Namaqua Metamorphic Complex, overlaid with some younger sedimentary rocks. No parts of the meteorite have been found, suggesting that it completely evaporated upon impact. The meteor that hit it was approximately the size of an SUV.

The Roter Kamm impact structure exposes a large volume of cataclastic/mylonitic and pseudotachylitic breccias in the basement granite and gneisses, which is unusual for small craters. Anomalous quartz found at the rim of the crater, and the primary fluid inclusions in the quartz, seem to provide evidence for post-impact hydrothermal activity, generated by impact heat, at the Roter Kamm impact crater. Eolian and alluvial processes each played a role in modifying the Roter Kamm impact crater since its formation. Much of the more recent history of crater modification relates to eolian processes. Active mobile sands largely bury the crater and effectively mask most of the signatures associated with prior activity by other processes. Ongoing eolian erosion is responsible for scouring of the exposed rim.

Gallery

See also 

 List of impact craters in Africa
 Geology of Namibia

References

Bibliography

Further reading 
 Bishop, J., Koeberl, C. and Reimold, W.U., Geochemistry of the Roter Kamm impact crater, SWA/Namibia (abstract). Meteoritics, v. 24, p. 252. 1989
 Blumberg, D. G., McHone, J.F., Kuzmin, R. and Greeley, R., Radar imaging of impact craters by SIR-C/X-SAR (abstract). Lunar and Planetary Science XXVI, pp. 139–140. 1995
 Brandt, D., Reimold, W.U., Franzsen, A.J., Koeberl, C., Wendorff, L., Geophysical profile of the Roter Kamm impact crater, Namibia, Meteoritics & Planetary Science 33, pp. 447–453. 1998
 Brandt, D., Reimold, W.U., Wendof, L., Koeberl, C. and Grant, J., Geophysical signatures of the Roter Kamm impact crater, Namibia (abstract). Lunar and Planetary Science, v. XXVII, pp. 153–154. 1996
 Degenhardt, Jr,J.J., Buchanan, P.C. and Reid, A.M., Impactite and pseudotachylite from Roter Kamm crater, Namibia (abstract). International Conference on Large Meteorite Impacts and Planetary Evolution, LPI Contribution No. 790, pp. 20–21. 1992
 Degenhardt, Jr, J.J., Buchanan, P.C., Reid, A.M. and Miller, R. McG., Breccia veins and dykes associated with the Roter Kamm Crater, Namibia. Geological Society of America Special Paper 293, pp. 197–208. 1994
 Degenhardt, Jr, J.J., Reid, A.M., Buchanan, P.C. and Miller, R. McG., Melt breccias from Roter Kamm impact crater, Namibia (abstract). Lunar and Planetary Science XXVI, pp. 323–324. 1995
 Degenhardt, Jr, J.J., Reid, A.M., Miller, R. McG. and Reimold, W.U., Breccias resembling melt bombs from the Roter Kamm Crater. Meteorites & Planetary Science, v. 31, pp. 413–415. 1996
 Dietz, R. S., Roter Kamm, southwest Africa: Probable meteorite crater. Meteoritics, v. 2, pp. 311–314. 1965
 Fudali, R. F., Roter Kamm: Evidence for an impact origin. Meteoritics, v. 8, pp. 245–257. 1973
 Grieve, R. A. F., Recent studies at the Roter Kamm impact crater. Meteoritics, v. 28, pp. 160. 1993
 Hartung, J. B., Kunk, M.R., Reimold, W.U., Miller, R. McG. and Grieve, R.A.F., Roter Kamm crater age: 3.5 to 4.0 Ma (abstract). Meteoritics, v. 26, pp. 342–343. 1991.
 Koeberl, C., African meteorite impact craters: Characteristics and geological importance. Journal of African Sciences, v. 18, pp. 263–295. 1994
 Koeberl, C., Klein, J., Matsuda, J., Nagao, K., Reimold, W.U. and Storzer, D., Roter Kamm impact crater, Namibia: Age constraints from K-Ar, Rb-Sr, fission track, and 10Be-26 Al studies (abstract). Meteoritics, v. 27, 244–245. 1992
 Koeberl, C., Reimold, W.U., Bishop, J. and Miller, R.McG., Roter Kamm impact crater, SWA/Namibia: New geochemical and isotopic studies and further evidence for post-impact hydrothermal activity (abstract). Lunar and Planetary Science XXI, pp. 647–648. 1990
 Koeberl, C., Reimold, W.U., Gotzinger, M. and Fredriksson, K., Quartz at the Roter Kamm crater and post-impact hydrothermal activity: A reply to E. Roedder. Geochemica et Cosmochimica Acta, v. 54, pp. 3249–3251. 1990
 Koeberl, C., The age of the Roter Kamm impact crater, Namibia: Constraints from 40Ar-39Ar, K-Ar, Rb-Sr, fission track, and 10Be-26Al studies. Meteoritics, v. 28, pp. 204–212. 1993
 Miller, R. McG., Reimold, W. U., Deformation and shock deformation in rocks from the Roter Kamm crater, SWA/Namibia (abstract). Meteoritics, v. 21, pp. 456–458. 1986
 Miller, R.M., Roter Kamm impact crater of Namibia; new data of rim structure, target rock geochemistery, ejecta, and meteorite trajectory. Special Paper-Geological Society of America, vol.465, pp. 489–508. 2010
Lunar and Planetary Science XXXIII. 2002
 Rajmon, D., Copeland, P., Reid, A.M., Lavigne,J-F., Temperature of Formation of Pseudotachylytic Impact Breccias, Roter Kamm Crater, SW Namibia, Meteoritics; vol. 34, No. 4, Supp. p. A95. 1999
Lunar and Planetary Science XXXV. 2004
 Reimold, W. U., Impact cratering - a review, with special reference to the economic importance of impacat structures and the southern African impact crater record. Earth, Moon, and Planets, v. 70, pp. 21–45. 1995
 Reimold, W. U., Koeberl, C. and Brandt, D., Suevite at the Roter Kamm impact crater, Namibia. Meteoritics & Planetary Science, v. 32, pp. 431–437. 1997
 Reimold, W. U., Koeberl, C. and Miller, R. Mc.G., Geochemistry of the melt rocks in the Roter Kamm impact structure, SWA/Namibia. Congress '90, 23rd Bienn. Congr., Geological Society of South Africa, Cape Town, pp. 718–723. 1990
 Reimold, W. U., Koeberl, C., Brandt., Suevite at the Roter Kamm Impact Crater, Namibia, Meteoritics; vol. 32, p. 431-7. 1997
 Reimold, W. U., Miller, R. McG., The Roter Kamm impact crater, SWA/Namibia. Proceedings Lunar and Planetary Science Conference 19th, pp. 711–732. 1989
 Reimold, W. U., Miller, R. McG., Grieve, R.A.F. and Koeberl, C., The Roter Kamm crater structure in SWA/Namibia (abstract). Lunar and Planetary Science XIX, pp. 972–973. 1988
 Reimold, W. U., Reid, A.M., Jakes, P., Zolensky, M. and Miller, R. McG., A magnetic survey across the Roter Kamm impact crater, Namibia (abstract). Lunar and Planetary Science XXIII, pp. 1143–1144. 1992
 Storzer, D., Koeberl, C and Reimold, W U., Age of the Roter Kamm impact crater, Namibia: A discussion based on fission track and isotopic measurements (abstract). Meteoritics, v. 25, pp. 411–412. 1990

Impact craters of Namibia
Zanclean
Neogene Africa
Geography of ǁKaras Region